A psychogenic effect is one that originates from the brain instead of other physical organs (i.e. the cause is psychological rather than physiological) and may refer to:
Psychogenic pain
Psychogenic disease
Psychogenic amnesia
Psychogenic cough, i.e. a habit cough
Mass psychogenic illness